Chaos is the mythological void state preceding the creation of the universe (the cosmos) in Greek creation myths. In Christian theology, the same term is used to refer to the gap or the abyss created by the separation of heaven and earth.

Etymology 
Greek kháos means 'emptiness, vast void, chasm, abyss', related to the verbs kháskō and khaínō 'gape, be wide open', from Proto-Indo-European , cognate to Old English geanian, 'to gape', whence English yawn.

It may also mean space, the expanse of air, the nether abyss or infinite darkness. Pherecydes of Syros (fl. 6th century BC) interprets chaos as water, like something formless that can be differentiated.

Chaoskampf

The motif of Chaoskampf is ubiquitous in myth and legend, depicting a battle of a culture hero deity with a chaos monster, often in the shape of a serpent or dragon. Parallel concepts appear in the Middle East and North Africa, such as the abstract conflict of ideas in the Egyptian duality of Maat and Isfet or the battle of Horus and Set.

Greco-Roman tradition

Hesiod and the Pre-Socratics use the Greek term in the context of cosmogony. Hesiod's Chaos has been interpreted as either "the gaping void above the Earth created when Earth and Sky are separated from their primordial unity" or "the gaping space below the Earth on which Earth rests." Passages in Hesiod's Theogony suggest that Chaos was located below Earth but above Tartarus. Primal Chaos was sometimes said to be the true foundation of reality, particularly by philosophers such as Heraclitus.

Archaic Period
In Hesiod's Theogony, Chaos was the first thing to exist: "at first Chaos came to be" (or was), but next (possibly out of Chaos) came Gaia, Tartarus, and Eros (elsewhere the name Eros is used for a son of Aphrodite). Unambiguously "born" from Chaos were Erebus and Nyx. For Hesiod, Chaos, like Tartarus, though personified enough to have borne children, was also a place, far away, underground and "gloomy," beyond which lived the Titans. And, like the earth, the ocean, and the upper air, it was also capable of being affected by Zeus's thunderbolts.

The notion of the temporal infinity was familiar to the Greek mind from remote antiquity in the religious conception of immortality. The main object of the first efforts to explain the world remained the description of its growth, from a beginning. They believed that the world arose out from a primal unity, and that this substance was the permanent base of all its being. Anaximander claims that the origin is apeiron (the unlimited), a divine and perpetual substance less definite than the common elements (water, air, fire, and earth) as they were understood to the early Greek philosophers. Everything is generated from apeiron, and must return there according to necessity. A conception of the nature of the world was that the earth below its surface stretches down indefinitely and has its roots on or above Tartarus, the lower part of the underworld. In a phrase of Xenophanes, "The upper limit of the earth borders on air, near our feet. The lower limit reaches down to the "apeiron" (i.e. the unlimited)." The sources and limits of the earth, the sea, the sky, Tartarus, and all things are located in a great windy-gap, which seems to be infinite, and is a later specification of "chaos".

Classical Greece
In Aristophanes's comedy Birds, first there was Chaos, Night, Erebus, and Tartarus, from Night came Eros, and from Eros and Chaos came the race of birds.

In Plato’s Timaeus, the main work of Platonic cosmology, the concept of chaos finds its equivalent in the Greek expression chôra, which is interpreted, for instance, as shapeless space (chôra) in which material traces (ichnê) of the elements are in disordered motion (Timaeus 53a–b). However, the Platonic chôra is not a variation of the atomistic interpretation of the origin of the world, as is made clear by Plato's statement that the most appropriate definition of the chôra is "a receptacle of all becoming – its wetnurse, as it were" (Timaeus 49a), notabene a receptacle for the creative act of the demiurge, the world-maker.

Aristotle, in the context of his investigation of the concept of space in physics, "problematizes the interpretation of Hesiod’s chaos as 'void' or 'place without anything in it'. Aristotle understands chaos as something that exists independently of bodies and without which no perceptible bodies can exist. 'Chaos' is thus brought within the framework of an explicitly physical investigation. It has now outgrown the mythological understanding to a great extent and, in Aristotle’s work, serves above all to challenge the atomists who assert the existence of empty space."

Roman tradition
For Ovid, (43 BC – 17/18 AD), in his Metamorphoses, Chaos was an unformed mass, where all the elements were jumbled up together in a "shapeless heap".

Ante mare et terras et quod tegit omnia caelum
unus erat toto naturae vultus in orbe,
quem dixere chaos: rudis indigestaque moles
nec quicquam nisi pondus iners congestaque eodem
non bene iunctarum discordia semina rerum.

Before the ocean and the earth appeared— before the skies  had overspread them all—
the face of Nature in a vast expanse was naught but Chaos uniformly waste.
It was a rude and undeveloped mass, that nothing made except a ponderous weight;
and all discordant elements confused, were there congested in a shapeless heap. 

According to Hyginus: "From Mist (Caligo) came Chaos. From Chaos and Mist, came Night (Nox), Day (Dies), Darkness (Erebus), and Ether (Aether)." An Orphic tradition apparently had Chaos as the son of Chronus and Ananke.

Biblical tradition

Chaos has been linked with the term abyss / tohu wa-bohu of Genesis 1:2. The term may refer to a state of non-being prior to creation or to a formless state. In the Book of Genesis, the spirit of God is moving upon the face of the waters, displacing the earlier state of the universe that is likened to a "watery chaos" upon which there is choshek (which translated from the Hebrew is darkness/confusion). 

The Vulgate, however, renders the χάσμα μέγα or "great gulf" between heaven and hell in Luke 16:26 as chaos magnum.

This model of a primordial state of matter has been opposed by the Church Fathers from the 2nd century, who posited a creation ex nihilo by an omnipotent God.

In modern biblical studies, the term chaos is commonly used in the context of the Torah and their cognate narratives in Ancient Near Eastern mythology more generally. Parallels between the Hebrew Genesis and the Babylonian Enuma Elish were established by Hermann Gunkel in 1910. Besides Genesis, other books of the Old Testament, especially a number of Psalms, some passages in Isaiah and Jeremiah and the Book of Job are relevant.

Hawaiian tradition
In Hawaiian folklore, a triad of deities known as the "Ku-Kaua-Kahi" (a.k.a. "Fundamental Supreme Unity") were said to have existed prior to and during Chaos ever since eternity, or put in Hawaiian terms, "mai ka po mai," meaning "from the time of night, darkness, Chaos." 

They eventually broke the surrounding Po ("night"), and light entered the universe. Next the group created three heavens for dwelling areas together with the Earth, Sun, Moon, stars, and assistant spirits.

Gnosticism
According to the Gnostic On the Origin of the World, Chaos was not the first thing to exist. When the nature of the immortal aeons was completed, Sophia desired something like the light which first existed to come into being. Her desire appears as a likeness with incomprehensible greatness that covers the heavenly universe, diminishing its inner darkness while a shadow appears on the outside which causes Chaos to be formed. From Chaos every deity including the Demiurge is born.

Alchemy and Hermeticism

The Greco-Roman tradition of prima materia, notably including the 5th- and 6th-century Orphic cosmogony, was merged with biblical notions (Tehom) in Christianity and inherited by alchemy and Renaissance magic.

The cosmic egg of Orphism was taken as the raw material for the alchemical magnum opus in early Greek alchemy. The first stage of the process of producing the philosopher's stone, i.e., nigredo, was identified with chaos. Because of association with the Genesis creation narrative, where "the Spirit of God moved upon the face of the waters" (Gen. 1:2), Chaos was further identified with the classical element of Water.

Ramon Llull (1232–1315) wrote a Liber Chaos, in which he identifies Chaos as the primal form or matter created by God. Swiss alchemist Paracelsus (1493–1541) uses chaos synonymously with "classical element" (because the primeval chaos is imagined as a formless congestion of all elements). Paracelsus thus identifies Earth as "the chaos of the gnomi", i.e., the element of the gnomes, through which these spirits move unobstructed as fish do through water, or birds through air. An alchemical treatise by Heinrich Khunrath, printed in Frankfurt in 1708, was entitled Chaos. The 1708 introduction states that the treatise was written in 1597 in Magdeburg, in the author's 23rd year of practicing alchemy. The treatise purports to quote Paracelsus on the point that "The light of the soul, by the will of the Triune God, made all earthly things appear from the primal Chaos." Martin Ruland the Younger, in his 1612 Lexicon Alchemiae, states, "A crude mixture of matter or another name for Materia Prima is Chaos, as it is in the Beginning."

The term gas in chemistry was coined by Dutch chemist Jan Baptist van Helmont in the 17th century directly based on the Paracelsian notion of chaos. The g in gas is due to the Dutch pronunciation of this letter as a spirant, also employed to pronounce Greek χ.

Modern usage
The term chaos has been adopted in modern comparative mythology and religious studies as referring to the primordial state before creation, strictly combining two separate notions of primordial waters or a primordial darkness from which a new order emerges and a primordial state as a merging of opposites, such as heaven and earth, which must be separated by a creator deity in an act of cosmogony. In both cases, chaos referring to a notion of a primordial state contains the cosmos in potentia but needs to be formed by a demiurge before the world can begin its existence.

Use of chaos in the derived sense of "complete disorder or confusion" first appears in Elizabethan Early Modern English, originally implying satirical exaggeration. "Chaos" in the well-defined sense of chaotic complex system is in turn derived from this usage.

"Chaos magic" as a branch of contemporary occultism is a product of the 1970s.

Popular culture has depicted the Chaos Greek deity in multiple instances. A modern instance is the popular 2020 video game Hades in which Chaos is represented as a genderless non-binary deity which dwells above the foundation of the underworld or "creation" itself.

See also

 Astrotheology
 Azathoth
 Brahman
 Creatio ex nihilo
 Ginnungagap
 Greek primordial deities
 Hundun
 Izanagi
 Izanami
 Kotoamatsukami
 Neith
Nu
 Śūnyatā
 Tiamat
 Tohu va bohu
 The Void
 Ymir

Footnotes

Notes

References
 
 
 Bishop, Robert (2017): Chaos. In: Zalta, Edward N. (ed.): The Stanford Encyclopedia of Philosophy (Spring 2017 Edition). https://plato.stanford.edu/archives/spr2017/entries/chaos/.
 
 Caldwell, Richard, Hesiod's Theogony, Focus Publishing/R. Pullins Company (June 1, 1987). .
 
 
 
 
  Greek text available from the same website.
 
 
 
 Lobenhofer, Stefan (2020): Chaos. In: Kirchhoff, Thomas (ed.): Online Encyclopedia Philosophy of Nature / Online Lexikon Naturphilosophie, doi: 10.11588/oepn.2019.0.68092; https://journals.ub.uni-heidelberg.de/index.php/oepn/article/view/69709.
 Morford, Mark P. O., Robert J. Lenardon, Classical Mythology, Eighth Edition, Oxford University Press, 2007. .
 Most, G. W., Hesiod: Theogony, Works and Days, Testimonia, Loeb Classical Library, No. 57, Cambridge, MA, 2006 . Online version at Harvard University Press.
 
  
  
  
  
 Tripp, Edward, Crowell's Handbook of Classical Mythology, Thomas Y. Crowell Co; First edition (June 1970). .* West, M. L. (1966), Hesiod: Theogony, Oxford University Press. .

Further reading
 Miller, Robert D. “Tracking the Dragon across the Ancient Near East.” In: Archiv Orientální 82 (2014): 225-45.

 
Ancient Near East mythology
Creation myths
Greek primordial deities
Mythological archetypes
Tiamat